Hornerstown may refer to:

Hornerstown, New Jersey
Hornerstown Formation